Iraq competed at the 1984 Summer Olympics in Los Angeles, United States.

Results by event

Boxing
Men's Light Flyweight (– 48 kg)
Abbas Zaghayer
 First Round — Lost to William Bagonza (UGA), RSC-2

References
Official Olympic Reports

Nations at the 1984 Summer Olympics
1984
1984 in Iraqi sport